Frank Gerald Mestnik  (born February 23, 1938 in Cleveland, Ohio) is a former American football fullback in the National Football League for the St. Louis Cardinals and the Green Bay Packers. He played college football at Marquette University in Milwaukee, Wisconsin. After graduation, he was drafted by the Cardinals in the 15th round (170th overall) of the 1960 NFL Draft.

1938 births
Living people
Players of American football from Cleveland
American football fullbacks
St. Louis Cardinals (football) players
Green Bay Packers players